They Died for Beauty is the debut studio album by English trip hop band Ilya. The album was released on May 11, 2004 via Virgin Records.

Track listing

References

2004 debut albums
Virgin Records albums
Ilya (band) albums